Cucurbita pepo is a cultivated plant of the genus Cucurbita. It yields varieties of winter squash and pumpkin, but the most widespread varieties belong to the subspecies Cucurbita pepo subsp. pepo, called summer squash.

It has been domesticated in the Americas for thousands of years. Some authors maintain that C. pepo is derived from C. texana, while others suggest that C. texana is merely feral C. pepo. They have a wide variety of uses, especially as a food source and for medical conditions. C. pepo seems more closely related to C. fraterna, though disagreements exist about the exact nature of that connection, too.

It is a host species for the melonworm moth, the squash vine borer, and the pickleworm. They are also the preferred pollen for squash bees.

History 
C. pepo is one of the oldest, if not the oldest domesticated species. The oldest known locations are in southern Mexico in Oaxaca 8,000–10,000 years ago and Ocampo, Tamaulipas, Mexico about 7,000 years ago. 

Before the arrival of Europeans C. pepo, along with C. moschata, had been carried over all parts of North America where they could be grown.  The ancient territory of C. pepo extended north into Texas and up the Greater Mississippi River Valley into Illinois and east to Florida, and possibly even to Maine. It is one of several plants cultivated in prehistoric North America as part of the Eastern Agricultural Complex. It is known to have appeared in Missouri at least 4,000 years ago. Some varieties grow in arid regions and some in moist regions. Many of these peoples, particularly in the west, still grow a diversity of hardy squashes and pumpkins not to be found in commercial markets.  Still, neither C. pepo nor C. moschata had been carried into South America as had beans, which originated in the same general region.

Debates about the origin of C. pepo have been going on since at least 1857. Recent biosystematic investigations indicate two distinct domestication events in two different areas: one in Mexico and one in the eastern United States, with Cucurbita pepo subsp. fraterna and Cucurbita pepo subsp. texana, respectively, as the predominant ancestral species from a phylogenetic perspective.

Taxonomy 
The morphological differences within the species C. pepo are so vast that its various subspecies and cultivars have been misidentified as totally separate species. These vast differences are rooted in its widespread geographic distribution. 

Several taxa have been proposed, but as of 2012 none has been universally accepted. In 2002, the taxa conventions proposed by Decker-Walters were:
C. pepo subsp. pepo - cultivated pumpkins, marrows, the orange gourds ("Orange Ball" and "Orange Warted")
C. pepo subsp. ovifera var. ovifera – cultivated crooknecks, scallops, acorns, most ornamental gourds
C. pepo subsp. ovifera var. ozarkana – wild populations in the Greater Mississippi Valley and Ozark Plateau
C. pepo subsp. ovifera var. texana – wild populations in Texas
C. pepo subsp. fraterna – wild populations in northeastern Mexico

A 2003 study recognized three subspecies:
Cucurbita pepo subsp. fraterna
Cucurbita pepo subsp. pepo
Cucurbita pepo subsp. texana

In 1986, botanist Paris proposed a taxonomy of C. pepo consisting of eight edible groups based on their basic shape. All but a few C. pepo cultivars can be included in these groups. These eight edible cultivated varieties of C. pepo vary widely in shape and color, and one inedible cultivated variety:

Description 
Due to their varied genetic background, members of C. pepo vary widely in appearance, primarily in regards to their fruits. The plants are typically 1.0–2.5 feet high, 2–3 feet wide, and have yellow flowers. Within C. pepo, the pumpkins, scallops, and possibly crooknecks are ancient and were domesticated separately. The domesticated species have larger fruits and larger yet fewer seeds. Parthenocarpy is known to occur in certain cultivars of C. pepo.

It is found from sea level to slightly above . Leaves have three to five lobes and are 20–35 cm wide. All the subspecies, varieties, and cultivars are conspecific and interfertile. Random amplified polymorphic DNA has proven useful in sorting out the relationships of the C. pepo species, varieties, and cultivars, showing that few, if any, modern cultivars have their origins with C. texana. They are associated with C. fraterna or a still unknown ancestral specimen in southern Mexico.

It has been proposed that the domesticated forms of Cucurbita pepo are a compilospecies of C. pepo subsp. fraterna and C. pepo subsp. texana. A 1989 study on the origins and development of C. pepo suggested that the original wild specimen was a small round fruit and that the modern pumpkin is its direct descendant. This investigation proposed that the crookneck, ornamental gourd, and scallop are early variants, and that the acorn is a cross between the scallop and pumpkin.

Based on genetic allele analysis, two distinct groups occur within domesticated Cucurbita pepo: pumpkin, calabaza, criolla, and marrow squash are in one; and ornamental gourds, crookneck, acorn, scallop, and a few others in the second one. C. pepo subsp. fraterna is genetically closer to the first group and C. pepo subsp. texana is genetically closer to the second group.

Subspecies fraterna 
This subspecies was formerly considered a separate species Cucurbita fraterna by some authorities but modern biosystematics has placed it as a subspecies of Cucurbita pepo. The isozymes are similar between Cucurbita pepo subsp. pepo, and all studied C. fraterna alleles are also found in C. pepo subsp. pepo. It is native to Tamaulipas and Nuevo León, Mexico. This subspecies has not been domesticated. It is considered to be the progenitor and nearest relative of the domesticated subspecies C. pepo subsp. pepo which is found in the same areas as C. pepo subsp. fraterna. It was first formally described by Liberty Hyde Bailey in 1943, in Gentes Herbarum.

Unlike most wild Cucurbita, some specimens of C. fraterna have been found without bitter fruit. Its usual habitat is dry upland scrub areas. It blooms in September and fruits ripen in December.

Subspecies texana 

This subspecies was formerly considered a separate species Cucurbita texana by some authorities before being reclassified as a subspecies of Cucurbita pepo. A common name is Texas gourd. This subspecies is mesophytic and native to Texas, primarily the southeastern region where it can be found in or near sandy riverbeds. It is found only in the wild. It is possibly a progenitor and close relative of the domesticated subspecies Cucurbita pepo subsp. ovifera, though they are native to different areas. The fraterna subspecies is also closely related. It was first collected 1835 by J. L. Berlandier in southern Texas. It was formally described as Tristemon texanus by George Heinrich Adolf Scheele in 1848 and transferred to the genus Cucurbita by Asa Gray in 1850.

Cultivars 
C. pepo includes a wide assortment of varieties and cultivars:
Acorn squash
Delicata squash
Dodi marrow, grown in South Asia
Gem squash
Heart of gold squash
Kamo kamo, also called kumi kumi, an heirloom summer and winter squash grown by the Māori people of New Zealand
Several types of ornamental squash (often called "gourds")
Pattypan squash
Several types of pumpkin
Spaghetti squash
Sweet dumpling squash
Yellow crookneck squash
Yellow summer squash
Zucchini, also known as courgette (or [vegetable] marrow cultivar)

Uses 
It is an ingredient in "schumaakwe cakes" and is used externally for rheumatism and swelling. A poultice of seeds and blossoms is applied to cactus scratches. Fresh squash is cut into spiral strips, folded into hanks and hung up to dry for winter use. The blossoms are cooked in grease and used as a delicacy in combination with other foods. Fresh squash, either whole or in pieces, is roasted in ashes and used for food. The gourds can be made into cups, ladles, and dippers and put to various uses. The gourds are also worn in phallic dances symbolizing fructification or made into ceremonial rattles. Gourds are also made into receptacles for storing precious articles.

Gallery

References

External links

 Kew plant profile: Cucurbita pepo (pumpkin)

pepo
Plants used in traditional Native American medicine
Crops originating from Pre-Columbian North America
Squashes and pumpkins
Plants described in 1753
Taxa named by Carl Linnaeus